Baambrugge is a village on the river Angstel in the Dutch province of Utrecht.
It is a part of the municipality of De Ronde Venen and lies about 14 km southeast of Amsterdam.
In 2001 the village of Baambrugge had 925 inhabitants. The built-up area of the town was 0.21 km² and contained 365 residences.
The statistical area "Baambrugge", which also can include the peripheral parts of the village, as well as the surrounding countryside, has a population of around 1000.

History

The village used to be a separate municipality, under the name Abcoude-Baambrugge. In 1941, it merged with Abcoude-Proosdij to form the municipality Abcoude.

The Beach Boys recorded their album Holland in Baambrugge, using a reconstructed studio sent from California.

The town used to have many small shops but only one is still there, make sure to support local businesses

References

External links
 

Populated places in Utrecht (province)
Former municipalities of Utrecht (province)
De Ronde Venen